State Route 28 (SR 28) is an east–west state highway in the U.S. state of Ohio.  Both of the route's termini are on U.S. Route 50 (US 50). Its western end is in Milford and its eastern end is near Chillicothe.  The route has an interchange with Interstate 275 (I-275), and also intersects US 68 and US 62.  The route was formerly signed as SR 27 before that number was assigned to US 27 in 1926.

History
The corridor that SR 28 currently occupies has been a part of the state highway system from its establishment in 1912. Between 1912 and 1922, the corridor had been known as State Highway 8. This road extended further west to Cincinnati and east to Chillicothe. Following a statewide renumbering of state routes around 1923, the current highway became a part of SR 27. SR 27 ran from Cincinnati to Logan by way of Laurelville and Enterprise. After the establishment of the U.S. highway system in 1926, the designation of US 27 in the southwestern corner of the state resulted in the renumbering of the roadway to SR 28. Following this renumbering, the road to Cincinnati became part of US 50 while the route to Logan resulted in a number of separate highways completing the former routing to the east: US 50, US 23, SR 159, SR 180, and SR 31 (now US 33).

Throughout most of its history, SR 28's routing has generally remained the same. Around 1994, a short controlled-access highway opened east of I-275 that bypassed Mulberry. The bypass features one interchange for Wolfpen-Pleasant Hill Road. Prior to 2015, a  concurrency existed along US 50 at SR 28's west end in Milford. The road extended along Main Street and Water Street where it crossed the Little Miami River into Hamilton County and ended at SR 126.

Major junctions

References

028
Transportation in Clermont County, Ohio
Transportation in Warren County, Ohio
Transportation in Clinton County, Ohio
Transportation in Highland County, Ohio
Transportation in Ross County, Ohio
U.S. Route 50
U.S. Route 23
U.S. Route 33